CareFlight is an air medical service headquartered in Westmead, New South Wales, Australia.

History

CareFlight was founded in Sydney, Australia in May 1986 as an aeromedical charity. Its mission is to save lives, speed recovery and serve the community. 
Since conducting their first mission in their sole helicopter, the Squirrel AS350B, in July 1986, CareFlight has grown to include helicopters, turboprop and jet aeroplanes, which fly on both domestic and international missions. In 2019, around 7,900 patients were treated by CareFlight.

Domestic Missions

CareFlight conducts daily missions across Australia, treating and transferring patients from accident scenes and between hospitals.

Major domestic missions

In 1998, CareFlight rescued seven sailors from the stricken yacht Business Post Naiad during wild storms in the 1998 Sydney to Hobart Yacht Race. The CareFlight crew of that mission later received the Prince Philip Award.

In 2003, CareFlight attended the Waterfall train crash in which seven people were killed. CareFlight medical teams triaged, treated and transported the injured.

In 2015, CareFlight launched a complex rescue mission to rescue helicopter pilot Matt Gane after his mustering helicopter crashed more than 800km south-east of Darwin.

In 2019, CareFlight rescued a critically ill man from a cruise ship that was located 200 kilometres off the coast of mainland Australia. This mission saw the CareFlight crew using a complex hover and winch recovery technique due to the absence of a helipad on the cruise ship.

International Missions

Since their first international retrieval mission, in 1990, from Penang, CareFlight has been bringing injured or sick overseas Australians back home.

Major international missions

In 2001, CareFlight played a role in the repatriation of victims of the Bali bombing in Denpasar Bali.

After the attempted assassination of East Timor's President Jose Ramos Horta in 2008, CareFlight International flew the President from Dili to Darwin, Australia, for medical treatment. CareFlight's clinical team comprising a specialist doctor, two nurses, pilot and first officer flew to New Zealand from Sydney on Thursday 12 December to retrieve two patients, who had suffered critical injuries in the 2019 Whakaari / White Island eruption.

Research and Innovation

Since 1986, CareFlight has invested in clinical, aviation, logistics and business planning research projects.

In 1998, CareFlight introduced their specially designed Stretcher Bridge the first portable intensive care module in 1998. The unit incorporates a ventilator, oxygen and suction capability, monitors and infusion pumps. The development of this concept has shaped and simplified the cabin fit of subsequent air medical craft, both rotary and fixed wing.

CareFlight designed and conducted the Head Injury Retrieval Trial (HIRT), the world's first randomised clinical trial to evaluate the benefits of rapidly transporting a doctor to patients with head injuries. Over the six-year period of the study (2006-2011), CareFlight responded to more than 1,500 patients. Most patients had been involved in motor vehicle accidents (the leading cause of brain injury from traumatic head injury), falls and other workplace accidents.

The HIRT research data indicated a 16 per cent reduction in deaths (45 percent to 29 percent) when unconscious patients are treated by a doctor. Former CareFlight Medical Director and Chief HIRT Investigator, Dr Alan Garner OAM, presented the results of this ground-breaking research at the 2012 International Conference for Emergency Medicine in Dublin.

In April 2018, CareFlight became the first and only civilian aeromedical service in Australia to perform pre-hospital plasma transfusions as part of their rapid response helicopter service. This was described by clinicians as a ‘quantum leap’ for emergency treatment, that experts say, in certain cases, could save one in three people who would otherwise die.

In 2019, CareFlight completed a research study looking at new technology for warming blood for use in pre-hospital blood transfusions. The first stage of the research confirmed the benefits of warming blood in emergency transfusions and the second stage tested different devices that can be used to rapidly warm blood in just minutes during the procedure. This research study, partially funded by the Medevac Foundation in the United States, was conducted in partnership with the cardiac anaesthesia services and blood bank at The Children's Hospital at Westmead.

Awards and Contracts

CareFlight received the 1998 Award for Aviation Safety Excellence in the AOC category.

In June 2011, the Northern Territory Government announced the award of a ten-year Top End Medical Retrieval Service contract to CareFlight. In October of the same year, CareFlight became Australia's only aeromedical provider to be awarded the European Aeromedical Institute (EURAMI) Accreditation for three years, Australia's only provider to hold this.

CareFlight Today

Today, CareFlight uses a fleet of helicopters, jet aircraft, turbo-prop planes and road vehicles, across Australia. 
In Sydney, CareFlight's rapid response helicopter, with a specialist doctor and critical care paramedic on board, attend to critically ill or injured patients performing treatments including roadside surgery and blood and plasma transfusions.

CareFlight retrieves seriously ill and injured patients from outback Northern Territory using helicopters, turbo prop planes and aeromedical jets as part of the Top End Medical Retrieval Service. CareFlight has operated this service (TEMRS) under an agreement with the Northern Territory Government since 1 January 2013. This agreement followed an open tender in 2011 to provide an integrated aeromedical service in the Top End.

CareFlight provides helicopter search and rescue services to organisations such as the Australian Maritime Safety Authority and provides pilots, aircrew and engineers to assist organisations such as New South Wales Rural Fire Service manage bushfire threats. They also provide critical and emergency care trained doctors to New South Wales Ambulance for fixed wing, rotary wing and road ambulance operations.
 
Seriously ill and injured interstate and internationally are treated and transferred via helicopter, turbo prop aeroplanes and jets. Patients are also transferred using specially modified road transport vehicles for specialist treatment in major hospitals.

Aircraft and Vehicle Fleet

In February 2021, CareFlight launched their Airbus H145 helicopter. The H145 was chosen for CareFlight's rapid response helicopter service as it can reach patients in its service area within 15 minutes. 

In April 2021, CareFlight NT launched their G150 Gulfstream G150 jet, Australia's first medical jet capable of transporting patients from south-east Asia. The G150 can fly 5,300 kilometres at a speed of 1,000 km/h, allowing it to travel from its base in Darwin to Sydney and Melbourne in under four hours.

Board and Governance

CareFlight's Board monitors and reviews the company's compliance with its statutory obligations ensuring it meets its legal obligations.
The Hon Dr Andrew Refshauge MBBS, FAICD is the chairperson of the board. Mick Frewen is the chief executive officer.

See also
LifeFlight
Royal Flying Doctor Service of Australia
Westpac Life Saver Rescue Helicopter Service
Angel Flight
Aspen Medical
 2009 Pel-Air Westwind ditching

References 

Medical and health organisations based in New South Wales
Health charities in Australia
Air ambulance services in Australia